Jules Houplain (born 4 February 1998) is a French actor known for his film roles as Louis in Hidden Kisses (2016) and Luis in "On voulait tout casser", as Juliette Binoche's character's son, Max in "Who You Think I Am" (2019), as well for portraying Yann Desgrange on the French television series "Les Innocents" (2018).

References

French male actors
Living people
1999 births